Kokomopterus is a genus of prehistoric eurypterid. The genus contains a single species, Kokomopterus longicaudatus, known from the Silurian of Kokomo, Indiana.

See also
 List of eurypterids

References

Stylonurina
Silurian eurypterids
Silurian arthropods of North America
Eurypterids of North America